Andrei Chesnokov was the defending champion, but did not participate this year.

Karel Nováček won the title, defeating Thomas Muster 6–4, 6–2 in the final.

Seeds

  Stefan Edberg (second round)
  Aaron Krickstein (second round)
  Michael Chang (first round)
  Jim Courier (quarterfinals)
  Carl-Uwe Steeb (second round)
  Pete Sampras (first round)
  Guillermo Pérez Roldán (first round)
  Horst Skoff (first round)

Draw

Finals

Top half

Bottom half

External links
 Singles draw

Singles